Darkel is the debut solo studio album by French musician Darkel (Jean-Benoît Dunckel), one half of the French electronica band Air. It was released in September 2006 (see 2006 in music).

Critical reception
Darkel was met with "mixed or average" reviews from critics. At Metacritic, which assigns a weighted average rating out of 100 to reviews from mainstream publications, this release received an average score of 55 based on 18 reviews.

In a review for AllMusic, critic reviewer Heather Phares wrote: "Darkel doesn't differ greatly from his work with Air - it's got the same mix of epic synth passages and sexy, starry-eyed pop, and his wispy, almost androgynous voice would be unmistakable in almost any setting. Sometimes Darkel seems in danger of floating away on its flights of fancy, suggesting that Godin gives some of Dunckel's more whimsical ideas some grounding when they work together as Air." Dorian Lynskey at The Guardian said: "Without his band's usual deep-pile arrangements, these twinkling melodies and synth-prog twiddles sound rather insubstantial; TV Destroy is tinselly new wave that would struggle to destroy a teabag." At Pitchfork, Marc Hogan explained: "While several of the songs evoke the woozy romance of Air's slower tracks, the usual aplomb of Dunckel's day job is lacking, so many fans may want to hold out for the new Air album due next year."

Track listing

Single
At the End of the Sky was released as a single with two additional tracks.
"At the End of the Sky" – 4:12
"Bunny Girl" – 4:37
"Stay" – 3:01

Personnel
Stephane "Alf" Briat – Mixing
Alex Gopher – Mastering
Laurent Griffon – Bass, Guitar
Earl Harvin – Drums
Hi-Five – Cover Art
Dayan Korolic – Bass
Anthony Mccann – Photography
Valérie Sonnier – Cover Photo

Release details

References

External links
Official website
Darkel at MySpace.
Darkel at Metacritic.
Review of "Darkel" on Subculture Magazine

2006 debut albums
Astralwerks albums